Josefine Krengel is a German football defender, currently playing for Lokomotive Leipzig in the Bundesliga. She previously played for Turbine Potsdam, Bayern Munich and Tennis Borussia Berlin.

References

1981 births
Living people
German women's footballers
Women's association football defenders
Women's association football midfielders